Head of the Family is a 1933 British drama film directed by John Daumery and starring Irene Vanbrugh, Arthur Maude and John Stuart. It was made at Teddington Studios as a quota quickie.

Cast
 Irene Vanbrugh as Mrs. Powis-Porter  
 Arthur Maude as Mr. Powis-Porter  
 John Stuart as Bill Stanmore  
 Pat Paterson as Geraldine Powis-Porter  
 D. A. Clarke-Smith as Welsh  
 Alexander Field as Bill Higgins 
 Roland Culver as Manny 
 Glen Alyn as Maisie  
 Annie Esmond as Mrs. Slade

References

Bibliography
 Chibnall, Steve. Quota Quickies: The Birth of the British 'B' Film. British Film Institute, 2007.
 Low, Rachael. Filmmaking in 1930s Britain. George Allen & Unwin, 1985.
 Wood, Linda. British Films, 1927-1939. British Film Institute, 1986.

External links
 

1933 films
British drama films
1933 drama films
Films shot at Teddington Studios
Warner Bros. films
Quota quickies
Films directed by Jean Daumery
British black-and-white films
1930s English-language films
1930s British films